Katarina Kozarov (born 1 May 1998) is a Serbian female tennis player.

Kozarov has a career high WTA singles ranking of 636 achieved on 31 October 2022. She also has a career high WTA doubles ranking of 444 achieved on 7 November 2022.

Kozarov played college tennis at Furman University.

Playing for Serbia Fed Cup team, Kozarov has a win–loss record of 0–1 in Fed Cup competition.

References

External links
 
 

1998 births
Living people
Serbian female tennis players
People from Novi Sad
Furman Paladins women's tennis players